Club Sport Brazi is a Romanian football club from Brazi founded in 2002. It is best known for its women's team, which was created in 2010. It competes in the First League.

Competition record
 Liga I
 4th: 2011, 2012

Current squad
As of 2 November 2012.

References

Association football clubs established in 2002
Women's football clubs in Romania
2002 establishments in Romania
Football clubs in Prahova County